The Yuma Sun is a newspaper in Yuma, Arizona, United States. It has a circulation of 18,799.

History 
Though not founded until 1896, the Yuma Sun can trace its history back to the Arizona Sentinel, the first newspaper in what is now the Yuma area. The Yuma Sun would eventually be formed by a merger of the Arizona Sentinel and the Yuma Sun's predecessor, the Yuma Morning Sun.

The Arizona Sentinel 
The Sentinel was founded in 1871 by David A. Gordon and C. L. Minor when Yuma was still known as Arizona City. The paper, originally called the Arizona Free Press, was renamed the Arizona Sentinel after one year of publication. Two years later, the paper's name was shortened to just the Sentinel.

In 1911, the paper merged with the Yuma Examiner to become the Arizona Sentinel and Yuma Weekly Examiner.

Then, in 1915, the paper merged with the Yuma Southwest to become the Arizona Sentinel Yuma Southwest. A little over a year later, the paper switched its masthead back to the Arizona Sentinel. Finally, in 1918 it was again renamed the  Yuma Examiner and Arizona Sentinel.

The paper moved from a daily to semiweekly in 1920, then became a daily once again later that same year.

In 1924, the paper merged again with Yuma Valley News and became the Examiner Sentinel News. In 1925 it shortened its name to  the Yuma Examiner.

By 1928 the Sentinel and the Examiner had become separate newspapers again. Sometime after, the Sentinel became daily.

The Yuma Morning Sun 
The Yuma Morning Sun first saw the light of day on April 10, 1896. The Sun was founded by Mulford Winsor, the son of a newspaper editor. This rendition of the paper would be printed off and on for a period of nine years.

Then, on November 15, 1905, the paper was renamed The Morning Sun, becoming a daily newspaper.

In 1916 the paper was met with disaster, when a flood caused the collapse of the Morning Sun's offices, destroying all of the files of paper for the previous 20 years. The disaster was a total loss for the paper. However, the paper was able to receive financial backing and shortly resumed publication.

Merger 
In the midst of the Great Depression, it was soon realized that Yuma, a city of only 5,000, could not support two daily newspapers. In 1935, F.F. McNaughton and R.E. "Doc" Osborn purchased both struggling newspapers and combined them.

While The Sun had been a morning newspaper, the new owners decided instead to publish the merged daily paper in the early afternoon as The Yuma Daily Sun. The owners reasoned that the main sources of national and world news — Washington, D.C., and New York — were two hours to three hours ahead of Yuma and so an afternoon newspaper would be able to carry the latest news of the outside world.

In 2001, the newspaper went back to its roots, changing its name to The Sun and returning to morning delivery seven days a week.

In 2009 the name of the newspaper was again changed. It became the Yuma Sun, reflecting its growing role as not only a printed newspaper but also as a digital source of information on the Internet.

Ownership 

1896 – Mulford Windsor

1909 – J.H. Westover

1935 – F.F. McNaughton (owner of the Pekin Daily Times) and R.E. "Doc" Osborn

1953 – Osborn and Don Soldwedel (son-in-law of McNaughton and later founder of Western News & Info)

Cox Enterprises acquired the Sun in 1984.

In 1996, Cox went on to sell its Arizona papers to Thomson Newspapers.

In 2000, Thomson sold the Arizona papers to Freedom Communications.

Rhode Island Suburban Newspapers acquired the Yuma Sun and the Porterville Recorder from Freedom in 2013.

References

External links

 
 

Newspapers published in Arizona
Daily newspapers published in the United States
Yuma, Arizona
Yuma County, Arizona
RISN Operations
Freedom Communications